ProMedica Herrick Hospital was a public hospital in Tecumseh, Michigan that is part of the ProMedica Health System. It closed in September 2020 and was replaced by Charles and Virginia Hickman Hospital in Adrian, which also replaced Bixby Memorial Hospital in Adrian.

See also
ProMedica Health System
The Toledo Hospital
Toledo Children's Hospital
Flower Hospital

References

External links
 

Hospitals in Michigan
Hospitals with year of establishment missing
Buildings and structures in Lenawee County, Michigan
Tecumseh, Michigan